Grant County Jail and Sheriff's Residence is a historic county jail and residence located at 215 East 3rd Street in Marion, Grant County, Indiana. It was designed by Richards, McCarty & Bulford and built in 1904. It consists of two distinct units that are constructed of red pressed brick with limestone detailing.  The residence is in the Queen Anne style with English Tudor details.  It sits on a raised basement and has a bell-cast roof. It has been converted into apartments.

It was listed on the National Register of Historic Places in 1990 and is part of the Marion Downtown Commercial Historic District.

See also
National Register of Historic Places listings in Grant County, Indiana

References

External links

Houses on the National Register of Historic Places in Indiana
Jails on the National Register of Historic Places in Indiana
Jails in Indiana
Marion, Indiana
Government buildings completed in 1904
Houses completed in 1904
Queen Anne architecture in Indiana
Tudor Revival architecture in Indiana
National Register of Historic Places in Grant County, Indiana
Individually listed contributing properties to historic districts on the National Register in Indiana